Around the Sun is a solo album by American guitarist Jeff Watson. Jeff Watson features two guest vocalists on this album; Steve Walsh from the band Kansas and Aaron Hagar. It was first released in 1993, then it was re-issued in 1999.

Track listing
All songs written by Jeff Watson except where noted

 "Glass Revenge" - 4:02
 "Life Goes On" (Steve Walsh, Jeff Watson)  - 3:39
 "Around the Sun" - 4:52
 "Follow" - 5:59
 "Anna Waits" - 5:00
 "Tight Rope" - 3:25 (Jeff Watson, Spike Orberg)
 "Leslie Ann" - 4:35
 "Man's Best Friend" - 5:36
 "Moment of Truth" - 4:19
 "Shadows of Winter" - 5:52
 "Serenity" - 4:53
 "Ghost Town" - 6:45
 "When My Ship Comes In" - 4:32

Personnel
Jeff Watson - guitars, backing vocals; bass (2–4, 6–9); drums (10-12); lead vocals (4,7,10,11,12)
Aaron Hagar - vocals (1, 9)
Steve Walsh - vocals (2, 3, 5, 6, 13)
Bob Daisley - bass (1, 5)
Spike Orberg - drums; backing vocals (2, 3, 6, 7); percussion (9)
Bob McBain - keyboards (4)
Curt Kroeger - percussion (4)
Jesse Bradman - keyboards, backing vocals (5)
Brad Russell - upright bowed bass (9)

References

External links
 http://www.allmusic.com/album/around-the-sun-mw0000243726

1993 albums
Jeff Watson (guitarist) albums